Kemal Okuyan (born 1962) is the General Secretary of the Communist Party of Turkey.

Youth 
Through his childhood and youth, he was in İzmir and İstanbul. He graduated from Boğaziçi University Political Sciences Department.

Political life 
He started his political activities in Workers Party of Turkey. After criticising the party's politics based on national democratic revolution he took part in a splinter group formed around the journal Socialist Power (Sosyalist İktidar) and he was among the first writers of the journal. After the 1980 Turkish coup d'état this group ceased to work. In 1986 he and his comrades founded the Gelenek journal around which they have formed a nucleus of a traditional communist party.

In the beginning of 1990's he and his comrades founded Party for Socialist Turkey and later on Party of Socialist Power. This party changed its name to Communist Party of Turkey in 2001 Congress. After the Communist Party of Turkey split in 2014, he resigned as general secretary and founded the Communist Party with Aydemir Güler. Okuyan was elected general secretary of the Central Committee after Communist Party of Turkey was rebuilt in 2017.

Works 
He is a columnist in the soL Portal a newspaper portal. He also wrote many books about political events in Turkey and the former Marxist–Leninist State.

Books 
 Texts Against Democracy (Demokrasiye Aykırı Yazılar)
 What Does The Soldiers' Party Want? (Asker Partisi Ne İstiyor?)
 Civic Society: Development of State (Sivil Toplum: Devletin Büyümesi)
 Understanding Stalin (Stalin'i Anlamak)
 The Understanding of Power of Socialism in Turkey (Türkiye'de Sosyalizmin İktidar Arayışı)
 The Book of What To Do-ists (Ne Yapmalı'cılar Kitabı)
 Theory of Socialist Revolution (Sosyalist Devrim Teorisi)
 Anti-Thesis on Dissolution of The Soviet Union (Sovyetler Birliği'nin Çözülüşü Üzerine Anti-Tezler)
 The Left Stuck Between Ergenekon and AKP (Ergenekon ve AKP Arasında Sıkışan Sol)
 The Exam of Patriotism of The Left of Turkey (Türkiye Solunun Yurtseverlik Sınavı)
 In The Shadow of Revolution: Berlin-Warsaw-Ankara 1920 (Devrimin Gölgesinde: Berlin-Varşova-Ankara 1920)

References

External links 
 Okuyan's writings on "soL" newsportal 

1962 births
Communist Party of Turkey (current) politicians
Living people
Turkish journalists
Turkish communists